Hospital of the Transfiguration (in Polish: Szpital Przemienienia) is a book by Polish writer Stanisław Lem. It tells the story of a young doctor, Stefan Trzyniecki, who after graduation starts to work in a psychiatric hospital. The story takes place during the Nazi occupation of Poland in the Second World War.

The book is the first of a trilogy entitled Time Not Lost, and the only one of the three translated into English.

Hospital of the Transfiguration is also available in paperback under  (Mariner Books, 1991).

Here "transfiguration" refers to the Transfiguration of Jesus and accordingly to the Church of the Transfiguration.

References

Novels by Stanisław Lem
Novels set during World War II
Novels about mental health
Novels set in psychiatric hospitals
1975 novels
Polish novels adapted into films